RV Laurence M. Gould is an icebreaker used by researchers from the United States' National Science Foundation. for research in the Southern Ocean. The vessel is named after Laurence McKinley Gould, an American scientist who had explored both the Arctic and Antarctic. He was second in command of Admiral Richard E. Byrd's first expedition to Antarctica from 1928 to 1930. He helped to set up an exploration base at Little America on the Ross Ice Shelf at the Bay of Whales.

Gould died in 1995 at the age of 98, and in the same year the National Science Foundation initiated the charter for the services of this ice-strengthened vessel to further its studies and knowledge of the Antarctic Peninsula and Southern Ocean.

The ARSV Laurence M. Gould is operated by the Antarctic Support Contract (ASC) on a long-term charter from Edison Chouest Offshore (ECO). ASC staffs the vessel with a charter representative to coordinate cruise planning and scheduling, and with technical staff to support science operations. ECO provides the vessel master, ice pilot, and crew.

The Gould, completed in 1998, is 230 feet long and is ice-classed ABS-A1, capable of breaking one foot of level ice with continuous forward motion. The Gould can accommodate 37 scientists and staff in one and two-person staterooms. The Gould acts as a resupply ship and does long term environmental research (LTER) in the Drake Passage and the Antarctic Peninsula, shuttling between Punta Arenas, Chile and Palmer Station, Antarctica. She replaced the RV Polar Duke as the main supply ship to Palmer Station.

References

External links
 Research Vessels of the US Antarctic Program
 Current position of the RV Laurence M. Gould
 News on the USAP Research Vessels in The Antarctic Sun

Research vessels of the National Science Foundation
Icebreakers of the United States
Ships built in Louisiana
1997 ships
United States Antarctic Program